This is a list of Wikipedia articles on notable viola players. In cases where a violist has also achieved fame in another musical area, such as conducting or composing, this is noted.

Notable violists

A
 Tasso Adamopoulos (1944–2021)
 Julia Rebekka Adler (b. 1978)
 Adolfo Alejo (b. 1986), conductor
 Sir Hugh Allen (1869–1946), conductor
 Kris Allen (b. 1985)
 Vladimir Altshuler (b. 1946), conductor
 Ruben Altunyan (1939–2021), composer, conductor
 Johann Andreas Amon (1763–1825)
 B. Tommy Andersson (b. 1964), composer, conductor
 Paul Angerer (1927–2017), composer
 Steven Ansell (b. 1954)
 Atar Arad (b. 1945), composer
 Cecil Aronowitz (1916–1978)
 Dino Asciolla (1920–1994)
 Jean-Marie Auberson (1920–2004), violinist, conductor
 Emilie Autumn
 Eddie Ayres (b. 1967)

B
 Joseph Baber (1937–2022), composer
 Johann Aegidius Bach (1645–1716), organist
 Johann Sebastian Bach (1685–1750), composer
 Sigismund Bachrich (1841–1913), composer, violinist
 August Baeyens (1895–1966), composer
 Vladimir Bakaleinikov (1885–1953), conductor, composer
 Michael Balling (1866–1925), conductor
 Alain Bancquart (1934–2022), composer
 Rudolf Barshai (1924–2010), conductor
 Hans-Christian Bartel (1932–2014), composer
 Yuri Bashmet (b. 1953)
 Cathy Basrak (b. 1977)
 Natalie Bauer-Lechner (1858–1921)
 Sally Beamish (b. 1956), composer
 Ludwig van Beethoven (1770–1827), composer
 Sviatoslav Belonogov (b. 1965)
 Mitrofan Belyayev (1836–1904)
 František Benda (1709–1786), composer
 Jiří Antonín Benda (1722–1795), composer
 Daniel Benyamini (1925–1993)
 Wilhelm Georg Berger (1929–1993), composer
 Yehonatan Berick (b. 1968), violinist
 Harry Berly (1905–1937)
 Lise Berthaud (b. 1982)
 Vasily Bessel (1843–1907), music publisher
 Roger Best (1936–2013)
 Mikhail Bezverkhny (b. 1947), violinist
 Franz Beyer (1922–2018), musicologist
 Hatto Beyerle (b. 1933), conductor
 Luigi Alberto Bianchi (1945–2018)
 Benjamin Blake (1751–1827), composer, violinist
 Herbert Blendinger (1936–2020), composer
 Joseph von Blumenthal (1782–1856), violinist, composer
 Alexandre Pierre François Boëly (1785–1858)
 Emil Bohnke (1888–1928), composer, conductor
 Vadim Borisovsky (1900–1972)
 Jacques Borsarello (b. 1951)
 York Bowen (1884–1961), composer, pianist
 Máximo Arrates Boza (1859–1936), composer
 Frank Bridge (1879–1941), composer
 Benjamin Britten (1913–1976), composer
 Carolyn Waters Broe, composer, conductor
 Sheila Browne (b. 1971)
 František Brož (1896–1962), composer
 Gerard von Brucken Fock (1859–1935), composer
 Bjarne Brustad (1895–1978), composer, violinist
 Peter Bucknell (b. 1977)
 Kenji Bunch (b. 1973)
 Caleb Burhans (b. 1980), composer

C
 John Cale (b. 1942)
 Helen Callus
 Bartolomeo Campagnoli (1751–1827), composer, violinist
 Giuliano Carmignola (b. 1951), violinist
 David Aaron Carpenter (b. 1986)
 Henri Casadesus (1879–1947)
 Gérard Caussé (b. 1948)
 Eugenio Cavallini (1806–1881), violinist, conductor
 Alain Celo (b. 1960), composer
 Ladislav Černý (1891–1975)
 Eugène Chartier (1893–1963), violinist, conductor
 Roger Chase (b. 1953)
 André Hippolyte Chélard (1789–1861), composer, conductor
 Rebecca Clarke (1886–1979), composer
 Caroline Coade
 Eric Coates (1886–1957), composer
 Paul Coletti (b. 1959)
 Anthony Collins (1893–1963), composer, conductor
 Serge Collot (1923–2015)
 Carlton Cooley (1898–1981), composer
 Winifred Copperwheat (190576), performer, teacher
 Paul Cropper (1913–2006)
 Wayne Crouse (1924–2000)
 John Curro (1932–2019), conductor

D
 David Dalton (1934–2022)
 Harry Danks (1912–2001)
 Steven Dann (b. 1953)
 Gyula Dávid (1913–1977)
 Tania Davis (b. 1975)
 Brett Dean (b. 1961)
 Christophe Desjardins (1962–2020)
 Jack Delano (1914–1997), composer
 Alan de Veritch (b. 1947)
 Brett Deubner (b.1968)
 Patrizia Di Paolo
 Roberto Díaz (b. 1960)
 Viacheslav Dinerchtein (b. 1976)
 Paul Doktor (1919–1989)
 Demetrius Constantine Dounis (1886–1954), violinist, pedagogue
 Dimitris Dragatakis (1914–2001), composer
 Karen Dreyfus
 Duncan Druce (1939–2015), composer
 Fyodor Druzhinin (1932–2007)
 Philip Dukes (b. 1968)
 Matthias Durst (1815–1875), violinist, composer
 Charles Dutoit (b. 1936), conductor
 Lawrence Dutton (b. 1954)
 Antonín Dvořák (1841–1904), composer

E
 Heinrich Wilhelm Ernst (1814–1865), violinist
 Ernest van der Eyken (1913–2010), composer, conductor

F
 Ralph Farris (b. 1970)
 Kristina Fialová
 Federigo Fiorillo (1753–c.1823), violinist, composer, pedagogue
 William Flackton (1709–1978), composer
 Richard Fleischman (b. 1963)
 Watson Forbes (1909–1997)
 Cecil Forsyth (1870–1941), composer
 Johannes Fritsch (1941–2010), composer
 Lillian Fuchs (1901–1995)
 Arthur Furer (1924–2013), composer, violinist
 Paul Walter Fürst (1926–2013), composer
 Kenji Fusé (b. 1965), composer

G
 Grigori Gamburg (1900–1967), composer, conductor
 John Garvey (1921–2006), conductor
 Ottmar Gerster (1897–1969), composer, conductor
 Carlo Maria Giulini (1914–2005), conductor
 Bruno Giuranna (b. 1933)
 Donald A. Glaser (1926–2013), Nobel Prize–winning physicist
 Roland Glassl (b. 1972)
 Rosemary Glyde (1948–1994), composer
 Rivka Golani (b. 1946)
 Richard Goldner (1908–1991)
 Jonny Greenwood, lead guitarist of Radiohead
 Ebbe Grims-land (1915–2015)
 Amihai Grosz (b. 1979)

H
 Veronika Hagen (b. 1963)
 Dietmar Hallmann (b. 1935)
 Hope Hambourg (1902–1989)
 Harutyun Hanesyan (1911–1987), composer
 John Harbison (b. 1938), composer
 Kenneth Harding (1903–1992), composer
 Joseph Haydn (1732–1809), composer
 Donald Heins (1878–1949), violinist, conductor, composer
 Willy Hess (1859–1939), violinist
 Raphael Hillyer (1914–2010)
 Paul Hindemith (1895–1963), composer
 Alfred Charles Hobday (1870–1942)
 Manfred Honeck (b. 1958), conductor
 Lorraine Hunt Lieberson (1954–2006), mezzo-soprano

I
 Nobuko Imai (b. 1943)
 Yuko Inoue

J
 Hanoch Jacoby (1909–1990), composer
 Baudime Jam (b. 1972), composer
 Leroy Jenkins (1932–2007)
 Raymond Jeremy (1890–1969)
 Otto Joachim (1910–2010), composer
 Matthew Jones (b. 1974), violinist

K
 Jiří Kabeš (b. 1946), singer, songwriter
 Thomas Kakuska (1940–2005)
 Jan Karlin (b. 1954), producer, administrator
 Jurgis Karnavičius (1884–1941), composer
 Gilad Karni
 Kim Kashkashian (b. 1952)
 Milton Katims (1909–2006), conductor
 Martha Strongin Katz (b. 1942)
 Hugo Kauder (1888–1972), composer, violinist
 Nigel Keay (b. 1955), composer
 Nigel Kennedy (b. 1956), violinist
 Louise Lincoln Kerr (1892–1977), composer
 Isabelle van Keulen (b. 1966), violinist
 Volker David Kirchner (1942–2020), composer
 Dmitri Klebanov (1907–1987)
 Paul Klengel (1854–1935), violinist, pianist
 Garth Knox (b. 1956)
 Ulrich Koch (1921–1996)
 Vesko Kountchev (b. 1974)
 František Kočvara (1730–1791), composer
 Katalin Kokas (b. 1978), violinist
 Johann Král (1823–1912), also played viola d'amore
 Tosca Kramer (1903–1976)
 Alison Krauss (b. 1971)
 Emil Kreuz (1867–1932)
 Milan Křížek (1926–2018), composer
 Boris Kroyt (1897–1969)
 Theodore Kuchar (b. 1960), conductor
 Ferdinand Küchler (1867–1937), violinist, composer
 Michael Kugel (b. 1946)
 Sigiswald Kuijken (b. 1944), violinist, conductor

L
 Michelle LaCourse
 Théophile Laforge (1863–1918)
 Édouard Lalo (1823–1892), composer
 Anne Lanzilotti (b. 1983), composer
 Jaime Laredo (b. 1941), violinist
 Victor Legley (1915–1994), composer
 Pierre Lénert (b. 1966)
 Harold Levin (b. 1956)
 Avri Levitan (b. 1973)
 Jodi Levitz
 Teng Li
 Ingvar Lidholm (1921–2017), composer
 Samuel Lifschey (1889–1961)
 Lim Soon Lee (b. 1957), conductor
 Alfred Lipka (1931–2010)
 Ernest Llewellyn (1915–1982), violinist, conductor
 Lloyd Loar instrument designer, composer, played viola alta
 James Lockyer (1883–1962)
 James Lowe (b. 1976), conductor
 Lydia Luce, singer-songwriter
 Pál Lukács (1919–1981)

M
 Jef Maes (1905–1996), composer
 Virginia Majewski (1907–1995)
 Sergey Malov (b. 1983), violinist
 Mat Maneri (b. 1969), composer, violinist
 Michael Mann (1919–1977), violinist
 Jethro Marks
 Carlo Martelli (b. 1935), composer
 Tatjana Masurenko (b. 1965)
 Uri Mayer (b. 1946), conductor
 Eduard Melkus (b. 1928), violinist
 Felix Mendelssohn (1809–1847), composer
 Vladimir Mendelssohn (1949–2021), composer
 Yehudi Menuhin (1916–1999), violinist
 John Metcalfe (b. 1964)
 Michel Michalakakos (b. 1954)
 Miroslav Miletić (1925–2018), composer
 Shlomo Mintz (b. 1957), violinist
 Alexander Mishnaevski
 Roberto Molinelli (b. 1963), composer, conductor
 Nils Mönkemeyer (b. 1978)
 Pierre Monteux (1875–1964), conductor
 Arie Van de Moortel (1918–1976), composer
 Wolfgang Amadeus Mozart (1756–1791), composer
 Janee Munroe (1923–2006)
 Henry Myerscough (1927–2007)

N
 Philipp Naegele (1928–2011), violinist
 Naruhito, Emperor of Japan (b. 1960)
 Oskar Nedbal (1874–1930), composer
 Paul Neubauer (b. 1962)
 Václav Neumann (1920–1995), conductor
 Maria Newman (b. 1962), violinist, composer
 Casimir Ney (1801–1877)
 Nokuthula Ngwenyama (b. 1976)

O
 Heiichiro Ohyama (b. 1947)
 David Oistrakh (1908–1974), violinist
 Raphaël Oleg (b. 1959), violinist
 Martin Outram

P
 Niccolò Paganini (1782–1840), composer, violinist
 Johannes Palaschko (1877–1932), violinist, composer
 Úna Palliser, vocalist, violinist
 Ian Parrott (1916–2012), composer
 Harry Partch (1901–1974), composer
 Ödön Pártos (1907–1977), composer
 Joseph de Pasquale (1919–2015)
 Bruno Pasquier (b. 1943)
 Pemi Paull (b. 1975)
 Pierre Pasquier (1902–1986)
 Clara Petrozzi (b. 1965), violinist, composer
 Allan Pettersson (1911–1980), composer
 Cynthia Phelps (b. 1961)
 Robert Pikler (1909–1984), violinist
 Ashan Pillai (b. 1969)
 Enrico Polo (1868–1953), violinist
 Jocelyn Pook (b. 1960), composer
 Diemut Poppen (b. 1960)
 Rita Porfiris (b. 1969)
 Ari Poutiainen (b. 1972)
 Lawrence Power (b. 1977)
 William Presser (1916–2004), composer, violinist
 Milton Preves (1909–2000)
 Joseph Primavera (1926–2006), conductor
 William Primrose (1904–1982)

Q
 Karl Traugott Queisser (1800–1846)

R
 Julian Rachlin (b. 1974), violinist
 Mary Ramsey (b. 1963), violinist, singer, songwriter
 Wilhelm Ramsøe (1837–1895), composer, conductor, violinist
 Émile Pierre Ratez (1851–1934), composer
 Mary Ruth Ray (1956–2013)
 Adolf Rebner (1876–1967)
 Ottorino Respighi (1879–1936), composer
 Sophia Reuter (b. 1971), violinist
 Allard de Ridder (1887–1966), conductor, composer
 Frederick Riddle (1912–1995)
 Timothy Ridout (b. 1995)
 Joaquín Riquelme García (b. 1983)
 Karen Ritscher
 Hermann Ritter (1849–1926)
 Carol Rodland
 Jean Rogister (1879–1964), composer
 Hartmut Rohde (b. 1966)
 Alessandro Rolla (1757–1841), composer
 Antonio Rolla (1798–1837), violinist, composer
 Paul Rolland (1911–1978)
 Max Rostal (1905–1991), violinist
 Simon Rowland-Jones (b. 1950)
 Vincent Royer (b. 1961)
 Miklós Rózsa (1907–1995), composer
 Thomas Ryan (1827–1903)
 Maxim Rysanov (b. 1978)

S
 Pauline Sachse (b. 1980)
 Luigi Sagrati (1921–2008)
 Philip Sainton (1891–1967), composer, conductor
 Matthias Sannemüller (b. 1951)
 Stephanie Sant'Ambrogio (b. 1960), violinist
 Guido Santórsola (1904–1994), composer
 Hermann Scherchen (1891–1966), conductor
 Peter Schidlof (1922–1987)
 Ervin Schiffer (1932–2014)
 Hanning Schröder (1896–1987), composer
 Franz Schubert (1797–1828), composer
 Joseph Schubert (1754–1837), composer, violinist
 Rudolf Schwarz (1905–1994), conductor
 Albert Seitz (1872–1937), composer
 Konstantin Sellheim (b. 1978)
 Tibor Serly (1901–1978), composer
 William Shield (1748–1829)
 Bernard Shore (1896–1985)
 Gilbert Shufflebotham (1907–1978), violinist
 Oscar Shumsky (1917–2000), violinist, conductor
 Paul Silverthorne (b. 1951)
 Robert Siohan (1894–1985), composer, conductor
 Nadia Sirota
 Hans Sitt (1850–1922)
 Scott Slapin (b. 1974), composer
 Kay Slocum
 Peter Slowik (b. 1957)
 Anton Stamitz (1750–c.1800), composer
 Carl Stamitz (1745–1801), composer
 Johann Stamitz (1717–1757), composer
 Helen Camille Stanley (b.1930), composer
 Jean Stewart (1914–2002)
 Scott St. John (b. 1969)
 Simon Streatfeild (1929–2019), conductor
 Jennifer Stumm
 Josef Suk (1929–2011), violinist
 Jean Sulem (b. 1959)
 Louis Svećenski (1862–1926)
 Gusztáv Szerémi (1877–1952), composer

T
 Robert Talbot (1893–1954), conductor, composer, violinist
 Václav Talich (1883–1961), conductor, violinist
 Antoine Tamestit (b. 1979)
 Will Taylor (b. 1968)
 Jan Tausinger (1921–1980), composer, conductor
 Arve Tellefsen, (b. 1936), violinist
 Yuri Temirkanov (b. 1938), conductor
 Mela Tenenbaum, violinist
 Lionel Tertis (1876–1975)
 Xaver Paul Thoma (b. 1953), composer
 Marcus Thompson (b. 1946)
 Katia Tiutiunnik (b. 1967), composer
 Lars Anders Tomter (b. 1959)
 Giuseppe Torelli (1658–1709), pedagogue, composer
 Sabine Toutain (b. 1966)
 Jacqueline Townshend (1912–1983), pianist, violinist
 Walter Trampler (1915–1997)
 Michael Tree (1934–2018)
 Anahit Tsitsikian (1926–1999), violinist, musicologist
 Karen Tuttle (1920–2010)

U
 Åke Uddén (1903–1987), composer, conductor
 Alfred Uhl (1909–1992)
 Chrétien Urhan (1790–1845)

V
 Roland Vamos (b. 1930)
 Léon van Hout (1864–1945)
 Emanuel Vardi (1915–2011)
 Maxim Vengerov (b. 1974), violinist
 Robert Vernon (b. 1949)
 Maurice Vieux (1884–1951)
 Johann Georg Hermann Voigt (1769–1811), composer
 Ladislav Vycpálek (1882–1969), composer, violinist

W
 Louis van Waefelghem (1840–1908)
 Ernst Wallfisch (1920–1979)
 Geraldine Walther (b. 1950)
 Johann Baptist Wanhal (1739–1813)
 Harry Waldo Warner (1874–1945), composer
 Melia Watras
 John Webb (b. 1969), composer
 Hieronymus Weickmann (1825–1895)
 Justus Weinreich (1858–1927), composer
 Franz Weiss (1778–1830)
 Henryk Wieniawski (1835–1880), violinist
 Emanuel Wirth (1842–1923), violinist
 Lena Wood (1899–1982)
 Mark Wood

X
 Hong-Mei Xiao (b. 1963)
 Pierre-Henri Xuereb (b. 1959)

Y
 Eugène Ysaÿe (1858–1931), violinist

Z
 Bernard Zaslav (1926–2016)
 Wen Xiao Zheng (b. 1981)
 Grigori Zhislin (1945–2017), violinist
 Lev Zhurbin (b. 1978), composer
 Tabea Zimmermann (b. 1966)
 Fidelis Zitterbart (1845–1915), composer
 Đuro Živković (b. 1975), composer, violinist
 León Zuckert (1904–1992), composer, violinist
 Pinchas Zukerman (b. 1948), violinist

See also

Lists of musicians

References

Violists
List

es:Viola#Violistas relevantes